The Justice and Unity Party (abbreviated as PKP) formerly known as Indonesian Justice and Unity Party (abbreviated as PKPI) is a political party in Indonesia.

The party was founded as the Justice and Unity Party (PKP) in December 1998 as a split from Golkar Party. According to PKP leaders, particularly retired General Edi Sudrajat, PKP's leader, Golkar was insufficiently cooperative with reform movements then active. The PKP also argued that Golkar's attitude toward Pancasila and the original 1945 constitution threatened the unity of Indonesia.

In the 1999 legislative elections, the party won 1.01% of the vote. This was not enough to qualify it to run in the following elections, so the party members established a new party under the current name. The party chairmanship remained in the hands of Edi Sudradjat. In the 2004 legislative elections, the party won 1.3% of the popular vote and 1 out of 550 seats. In the 2009 legislative election, the party won 0.9 percent of the vote, less than the 2.5 percent electoral threshold, meaning that it lost its only seat in the People's Representative Council.

The party opposes the International Monetary Fund and privatization. Its main support is concentrated in North Sumatra, West Java and Central Java.

Election results

Legislative election results

Presidential election results

Note: Bold text suggests the party's member

References

Secularism in Indonesia
Pancasila political parties
Political parties established in 1998
Political parties in Indonesia